For a list of tallest proposed buildings, see either 

 List of future tallest buildings, or
 List of visionary tall buildings and structures.